Connecticut's 118th House of Representatives district elects one member of the Connecticut House of Representatives. It encompasses parts of Milford and has been represented by Democrat Frank Smith since 2021.

Recent elections

2020

2018

2016

2014

2012

References

118